From 1727 until 1912, roughly corresponding to the era of Tibet under Qing rule, the Qing Emperor appointed "imperial commissioner-resident of Tibet". The official rank of the imperial resident is amban (Tibetan: བོད་བཞུགས་ཨམ་བན, bod bzhugs am ban, colloquially "High Commissioner"). With increasing diplomatic contacts between the British and the Qing in from the 1890s, some assistant ambans were just as notable as the senior ambans. Two of them,  Feng Quan and Zhao Erfeng, who were stationed in Chamdo, were both murdered, the former in the Batang uprising and the latter in Xinhai Revolution.

List
The ethnicity of several ambans are unknown. By ethnicity, of the 80 ambans, most were Manchu and four were Han: Zhou Ying, Bao Jinzhong, Meng Bao, and Zhao Erfeng. At least fifteen Mongols were known to have served as ambasa, perhaps more.

(H=Han, M=Mongol, ?=unknown, unmarked=Manchu)

 Sengge 僧格 1727–1733
 Mala 馬臘 1728,1729–1731, 1733–1736
 Mailu 邁祿 1727–1733
 Zhou Ying 周瑛 1727–1729 (Han)
 Bao Jinzhong 包進忠 1729–1732 (Han)
 Qingbao 青保 1731–1734 (Mongol)
 Miaoshou 苗壽 1731–1734
 Lizhu 李柱 1732–1733
 A'erxun 阿爾珣 1734
 Nasutai 那素泰 1734–1737
 Hangyilu 杭弈祿 1737–1738
 Jishan 紀山 1738–1741
 Suobai 索拜 1741–1744, 1747–1748
 Fuqing 傅清 1744–1748
 Labudun 拉布敦 1748–1749
 Tongning 同寧 1750
 Bandi 班第 1750–1752 (the first with official Amban title)
 Duo'erji 多爾濟 1752–1754 (?)
 Salashan 薩拉善 1754–1757
 Guanbao 官保 1757–1761
 Funai 輔鼐 1761–1764
 Aminertu 阿敏爾圖 1764–1766
 Guanbao 官保  1766–1767
 Manggulai 莽古賚 1767–1773
 Wumitai 伍彌泰 1773–1775 (Mongol)
 Liubaozhu 留保住 1775–1779, 1785–1786 (Mongol)
 Suolin 索琳 1779–1780
 Boqing'e 博清額 1780–1785
 Fozhi 佛智 1788–1789
 Shulian 舒濂 1788–1790
 Bazhong 巴忠 1788–1789 (Mongol)
 Pufu 普福 1790 (Mongol)
 Baotai 保泰 1790–1791
 Kuilin 奎林 1791
  鄂輝 1791–1792
 Chengde 成德 1792–1793
 Helin 和琳 1792–1794
 Songyun 松筠 1794–1799 (Mongol)
 Yingshan 英善 1799–1803
 Hening 和甯 1800 (Mongol)
 Funing 福甯 1803–1804
 Cebake 策拔克 1804–1805 (Mongol)
 Yuning 玉甯 1805–1808
 Wenbi 文弼 1808–1811
 Yangchun 陽春 1811–1812
 Hutuli 瑚圖禮 1811–1813
 Ximing 喜明 1814–1817
 Yulin 玉麟 1817–1820
 Wen'gan 1820–1823
 Songting 松廷 1823–1827
 Huixian (Qing official) 惠顯 1827–1830
 Xingke 興科 1830–1833
 Longwen 隆文 1833–1834
 Wenwei 文蔚 1834–1835,1853
 Qinglu 慶祿 1836 (Mongol)
 Guanshengbao 關聖保 1836–1839
 Meng Bao 孟保 1839–1842/1843 (Han)
 Haipu 海朴 1842–1843
 Qishan 琦善 1843–1847
 Binliang 斌良 1847–1848
 Muteng'e 穆騰額 1848–1852
 Haimei 海枚 1852
 Hetehe 赫特賀 1853–1857 (Mongol)
 Manqing 滿慶 1857–1862 (Mongol)
 Chongshi 崇實 1859–1861
 Jingwen 景紋 1861–1869 
 Enlin 恩麟 1868–1872 (Mongol)
 Chengji 承繼 1872–1874
 Songgui 松溎 1874–1879
 Seleng'e 色楞額 1879–1885
 Wenshuo 文碩 1885–1888
 Changgeng 長庚 1888–1890
 Shengtai 升泰 1890–1892 (Mongol)
 Kuihuan 奎煥 1892–1896
 Wenhai 文海 1896–1900
 Qingshan 慶善 1900
 Yugang 裕鋼 1900–1902 (Mongol)
 Assistant: An Cheng 
 You Tai 有泰 1902–1904 (Mongol)
 Assistant: Naqin
 Assistant: Gui Lin 桂霖
 Assistant: Feng Quan 鳳全 (Manchu), placed at Chamdo, murdered in Batang uprising en route 
 Tang Shaoyi 1904–1906 (Han)
 Assistant: Zhang Yintang (Han), refused appointment as assistant amban, but effectively functioned as one.
 Lian Yu 聯豫 1906–1912
 Assistant: Wen Tsung-Yao 1906–1912
 Assistant: Zhao Erfeng 趙爾豐 (Han) at Chamdo
 General Chung Ying 1912–1913

See also
 Tibet under Qing rule
 List of rulers of Tibet

References

 Sources
 
 
Kolmaš, Josef. The Ambans and Assistant Ambans of Tibet, Archiv Orientální. Supplementa 7. Prague: The Oriental Institute, 1994.
 
 
 

Qing dynasty people
Tibet-related lists
History of Tibet
Lists of Chinese people